The Willie Nelson Family is a collaborative studio album by Willie Nelson, his sons Lukas and Micah, his daughters Paula and Amy and his sister Bobbie Nelson, accompanied by the Family Band. The album was Bobbie's final before her death in 2022. The record includes covers of inspirational songs and reinterpretations of Nelson's classics. Lukas Nelson sings lead on the songs "All Things Must Pass" and "Keep It on the Sunnyside" and Micah Nelson sings lead on "Why Me". It was released on November 19, 2021. The album was nominated for the Grammy Award for Best Roots Gospel Album at the 65th Annual Grammy Awards.

Critical reception

The Willie Nelson Family received positive reviews from music critics. At Metacritic, which assigns a normalized rating out of 100 to reviews from mainstream critics, the album received a score of 69 out of 100 based on five reviews, indicating "generally favorable reviews."

Track listing

Personnel
Adapted from the album liner notes.

Performance
Billy English - drums
Paul English - percussion
Amy Nelson - background vocals
Bobbie Nelson - piano
Lukas Nelson - acoustic guitar, lead vocals, background vocals
Micah Nelson - acoustic guitar, drums, bass, lead vocals, background vocals
Paula Nelson - background vocals
Willie Nelson – lead vocals, background vocals, Trigger
Mickey Raphael – harmonica
Kevin Smith - bass

Production
Steve Chadie – production, recording, mixing
Shannon Finnegan – production coordinator
Charlie Kramsky - assistant engineer
Willie Nelson - production
Jerry Tubb - mastering

Other personnel
Dalton Campbell - photography
 Frank Harkins - design
Christopher Wray McCann - additional photography

References

2021 albums
Willie Nelson albums
Legacy Recordings albums